John Rothwell Willis  was an Irish Anglican priest.

Willis was  educated at Trinity College, Dublin. He was ordained in 1895. After a curacy in Crosspatrick, he held incumbencies at Preban  and Gorey. He was  Archdeacon of  Ferns from 1934 to 1947.

Notes

Alumni of Trinity College Dublin
Irish Anglicans
Archdeacons of Ferns